Yaogan is the cover name used by the People's Republic of China to refer to its military reconnaissance satellites. Yaogan satellites are largely known to primarily support the People's Liberation Army's Strategic Support Force (PLASSF), formerly the Aerospace Reconnaissance Bureau of the Second Department of the General Staff. Yaogan satellites are the successor program to the Fanhui Shi Weixing (FSW) recoverable reconnaissance satellite program but, unlike its predecessor, includes a variety of classes utilizing various means of remote sensing such as optical reconnaissance, synthetic-aperture radar (SAR), and electronic intelligence (ELINT) for maritime surveillance. Yaogan satellites have been launched from the Taiyuan Satellite Launch Center (TSLC) in Shanxi province, the Jiuquan Satellite Launch Center (JSLC) in Inner Mongolia Autonomous Region, and the Xichang Satellite Launch Center (XSLC) in Sichuan province.

Although individual Yaogan satellites are often referred to by their number (e.g. Yaogan-18), Chinese military reconnaissance satellites are typically categorized by their military Jianbing designation. Jianbing translates to "point soldier", "vanguard", or "pioneer" and entered use in satellite designations with China's very first series of reconnaissance satellites, FSW-0, as the Jianbing-1 series. The first Yaogan satellite, Yaogan 1, is one of three Jianbing-5 (JB-5) series satellites following the final FSW-3 satellites of the Jianbing-4 (JB-4) series. Because Jianbing designations are secret and only Yaogan numbers are officially used, the Jianbing designations for later classes still remains unknown to the public.

Classes

Synthetic-aperture radar 
Chinese synthetic-aperture radar (SAR) sensor development began in the late 1970s under the Electronic Research Institute of the China Academy of Sciences (CAS) resulting in the testing of the first airborne X-band mono-polarization SAR collection in 1981. By 1994, CAS had introduced its first operational, real-time airborne SAR system to monitor flooding and transmit collected data to ground stations. Preliminary research and development of China's first-generation, space-based SAR system began sometime in the 1980s with development beginning in full in 1991. High-resolution, space-based SAR collection has been ambitiously pursued by the PLA for its potential contributions to all-weather targeting of naval forces in the Taiwan Strait.

Jianbing-5 series satellites (abbreviated "JB-5") are China's first space-based synthetic-aperture radar (SAR) satellites and the first satellites in the Yaogan program. The development and production of the Jianbing-5 series of satellites have been entirely funded by the People's Liberation Army (PLA) as the ability to penetrate the seemingly constant cloud cover present in the southern provinces of Tibet, Sichuan, Yunnan, Guangxi, Guandgong, and Hainan challenges traditional optical collection in those regions. The PLA also believes that in a potential war SAR collection capabilities will be vital to information dominance by mapping terrain, identifying targets through cloud cover, rain, fog, and dust, and potentially monitoring enemy submarines in shallow waters or targets in subterranean facilities. In May 1995, the finalized designs were approved and development began in earnest with the approval of the State Science & Technology Committee (SSTC) and Commission for Science, Technology, and Industry for National Defense (COSTIND). The China Academy of Science (CAS) Institute of Electronics built the SAR instruments onboard Jianbing-5 satellites, the craft itself designed by the Shanghai Academy of Spaceflight Technology (SAST) who also develops the Long March 4B launch vehicle. Other developers involved in the project are the China Academy of Space Technology (CAST or 5th Space Academy) 501st and 504th Institutes, the China Electronics Technology Group Corporation (CETC)'s Nanjing Research Institute of Electronic Technology (known also as the 14th Institute), the Southwest Institute of Electronic Equipment (SWIEE or 29th Institute), and the Beijing University of Aeronautics & Astronautics (BUAA). SAST is also the developer of the Feng Yun series of weather satellites.

Jianbing-5 satellites are built by the Shanghai Academy of Spaceflight Technology (SAST) and launched from the Taiyuan Satellite Launch Center (TSLC) and provide military analysts synthetic-radar imagery purportedly at a spatial resolution as sharp as 5 meters over the L-band (1–2 GHz). JB-5 satellites have been confirmed to have an electronic motor-powered solar panel which can be expanded and contracted by the ground control station. Jianbing-5 class satellites have a reported mass of 2,700 kilograms, orbital inclination of approximately 97° in sun-synchronous orbit, and with two operational satellites enjoys a twice daily revisit rate at a 45° viewing angle. Between April 2006 and August 2010, China launched three Jianbing-5 SAR satellites, the last two of which remain in operation from Taiyuan SLC. Yaogan 1, launched in April 2006, reportedly broke up around 4 February 2010 almost four years after its launch. Due to the small number of pieces and low orbital speeds, the breakup was likely due to an internal explosion, not a high-speed collision.

Yaogan 29, launched in November 2015 into a similar orbit, appears to be the modernized successor to the Jianbing-5 series of SAR satellites.

The Jianbing-7 class of Yaogan satellites, with military designations beginning with "JB-7", are Chinese military radar reconnaissance satellites built by SAST with an orbital period of 97 minutes and a side-looking radar system designed by the Institute of Electronics, Chinese Academy of Sciences. As of July 2022, China has launched four Jianbing-7 radar satellites with the first launched in April 2009 and the latest in November 2014 with a mass of 1,200 kilograms (2,600 pounds) from Taiyuan SLC. The third satellite of the Jianbing-7 class, launched in October 2013, had its orbit lowered from April to July 2020 and consequently underwent an uncontrolled decay reentering the atmosphere in 2021.

Although the Jianbing designation is still unknown for latest class of SAR reconnaissance satellites, China has launched three satellites of a modernized successor class to the Jianbing-5 and Jianbing-7 classes of SAR reconnaissance satellites. This class uses the same orbit as the Jianbing-5 class but likely has a different design according to published illustrations. The second satellite of this class, Yaogan 33, failed to reach orbit in May 2019. Its likely replacement, Yaogan 33R, was launched a year and a half later but used different launch site (Jiuquan instead of Taiyuan) and into a higher orbit (682 km × 686 km).

Electro-optical 
The Jianbing-6 class of Yaogan satellites, with military designations beginning with "JB-6", provides the Chinese military optical imaging capabilities to compliment the Jianbing-5 class's SAR reconnaissance capabilities. It has been reported that satellites of the Jianbing-6 class have a resolution of 0.8 meters. Jianbing-6 satellites were developed by CAST based on the CAST2000 satellites bus originally developed by the China SpaceSat Company Ltd. Jianbing-6 satellites image the Earth with a spatial resolution of approximately 1.5 meters and transmit them via X-band receiving telemetry, tracking, and command signals over the S-band. As of July 2022, China individually launched six Yaogan satellites of the Jianbing-6 class into low Earth orbit (LEO) with the first satellite launched in May 2006 and the latest in May 2016. The Bolivian Agency for Space Activities signed a US$140 million deal with China Great Wall Industries Co. Ltd. to launch the Venezuelan Remote-Sensing Satellite 1 (VRSS-1) in May 2011 marking China's first export of a reconnaissance satellite. VRSS-1 was based on the design of Jianbing-6 satellites and was launched on 29 September 2012 from Jiuquan SLC.

The Jianbing-9 class of Yaogan satellites, with military designations beginning with "JB-9" provides the Chinese military with optical imaging capabilities, likely as a successor to the Jianbing-6 class, thought it does orbit at a much higher altitude at 1,200 km indicating that satellites of this class are lower-resolution mapping and area surveillance satellites. The optical payload of Yaogan satellites in the Jianbing-9 class was developed by the Changchun Institute of Optics, Fine Mechanics, and Physics. China has launched five individual Yaogan satellites of the Jianbing-9 class with the first launched in December 2009 and the latest in August 2015 from Taiyuan SLC.

The Jianbing-10 class of Yaogan satellites, with military designations beginning with "JB-10" provides the Chinese military with optical imaging capabilities. Believed to also be based on the CAST2000 satellite bus, like those of the Jianbing-6 class, three Jianbing-10-class satellites built by CAST and carrying an optical imaging system from the Xian Institute of Optics and Precision Mechanics have been individually launched with the first launched in December 2008 and the reported last of the class in September 2014 from Taiyuan SLC.

The Jianbing-11 class of Yaogan satellites, with military designations beginning with "JB-11" provides the Chinese military with optical imaging capabilities. As of May 2022, China has launched two individually launched Yaogan satellites of the Jianbing-11 class with the first launched in May 2012 and the latest in November 2015.

The Jianbing-12 class of Yaogan satellites, with military designations beginning with "JB-12", are military optical reconnaissance satellites.

Electronic intelligence 
In response to Taiwanese President Lee Teng-hui's visit to the United States in 1995, the PRC initiated the Third Taiwan Strait Crisis conducting high-profile missile tests, amphibious landing drills, and troop staging in Fujian Province, across the strait from the island of Taiwan. The United States government responded to the PRC's escalation by deploying the largest American show of force since the Vietnam War including sending two American carrier battle groups which effectively forced the PRC to deescalate. Since then, the PLA has committed to design and field advanced anti-ship missile systems including the Dong Feng 21 and has deployed nearly sixty maritime surveillance satellites using electronic intelligence (ELINT) to locate, identify, and track adversarial vessels to support targeting.

The Jianbing-8 class of Yaogan satellites, with military designations beginning with "JB-8", consist of one primary satellite and two sub-satellites launched in triplets. These satellites reportedly perform an ocean or naval surveillance mission similar to those of the United States' Naval Ocean Surveillance System (NOSS or PARCAE) despite the Chinese state-media's insistence they were designed to "conduct electromagnetic environmental monitoring and related technology tests". The triplet groups likely fly in a loose formation to locate radio emitters using the difference in time of arrival of radio signals at the different satellites. Jianbing-8 satellites are based on the CAST2000 satellites bus and have a mass of 200 kilograms (440 pounds) and an orbital period of 107.10 minutes in LEO. As of May 2022, there have been nine launches of Jianbing-8 triplets (twenty-seven total satellites) from Jiuquan SLC with the first triplet launching in March 2010 and the latest in March 2021.

The CX-5 or Chuangxin-5 class of satellites, the only known Yaogan satellites to have been launched at Xichang SLC, are still largely shrouded in secrecy and their purpose is only speculated to be ELINT by nature of their triplet launches, similar to satellites of the Jianbing-8 class.

Satellites

See also 

 USSR / Russia - Kosmos (satellite)
 United States - NOSS
 France - CERES (satellite)

References 

Reconnaissance satellites
Earth observation satellites of China
Synthetic aperture radar satellites
Spacecraft launched by Long March rockets
Satellite series
Military equipment introduced in the 2000s
Satellites of China